Lunenburg English is a moribund, German-influenced dialect of English, spoken in the town of Lunenburg and Lunenburg County in the province of Nova Scotia. It is sometimes called "Lunenburg Dutch". The dialect shows unique features in pronunciation, e.g. unusual handling of rhotic consonants, in syntax and vocabulary, which portray the various sociohistorical influences.

History 
Lunenburg was founded in 1753. Troops from Braunschweig-Lüneburg settled in Nova Scotia as well as many Germans, some Swiss and French (from Montbéliard). In addition, between 1759 and 1768 around 8000 New Englanders settled in Nova Scotia as well and also had a great influence upon the dialect in the county.

Although German emigrants at this time were mostly from the Electoral Palatinate and Württemberg, the town Lüneburg where the name originates from was in the Electorate of Brunswick-Lüneburg. That might be caused by some German veterans who had been in the King's service. During the early years of the settlement German, French, and English were all spoken privately and in church. However, French died out first, while German prevailed longer. The majority of the Lunenburg settlers belonged either to Lutheranism or Calvinism. Several Lutheran churches used German for sermons and received German-speaking clergy from Germany or Pennsylvania, United States, until the end of the 19th century. Thus, the Lutheran church helped to preserve the language in public use.

German was more commonly used in the countryside than in the town itself. Most families who used German in the town were engaged in farming or simple labour. It is no longer spoken in the town. The ninth census of Canada, in 1951, revealed that 15,531 out of 33,183 of the population in Lunenburg show a German ethnic background. However, only 78 residents, all of whom presumably came from the oldest generation, listed German as their mother tongue.

Pronunciation in Lunenburg county "is known to be the only mainland White Canadian community to be non-rhotic." That shibboleth, however, cannot be traced back to influence from German since in the 18th century, it was highly rhotic. However, New England speech is non-rhotic, and one suggestion is that the New Englanders who settled seven or eight years after the non-English-speaking Foreign Protestants taught them English and so they greatly influenced the dialect.

Pronunciation 
There are several unique characteristics regarding the pronunciation. The most distinctive is that it is nonrhotic and so vowel length is phonemic, like in Australian English. However, some homonyms and some smaller particularities are also limited to the region.

There is word-internal linking , as in story  (compare store ).

Not all people in Lunenburg still speak that way, especially since younger people tend to reintroduce the etymological . That is caused by the influence of newcomers who come from other parts of the province or from Massachusetts.

The accent features Canadian raising and so flight  has a different vowel from fly , and the noun house  has a different vowel from the verb house . The raising is phonemic in the latter case and so the stressed vowel in the former word belongs to the  phoneme, and the corresponding verb has : . In Lunenburg, the phrase about a boat contains two identical stressed and two identical unstressed vowels: , rather than the Standard Canadian English , with distinct stressed vowels.

German influence 

Sample of a conversation between two people: "De kids vere over der in da woods, gettin inda dis an dat." "Dey never did?" "Yeah, an now dey gone da get some of dem der apples you see." "You don't say?" "no foolin, dey over der now." "Dey brung some of dem apples over heera da day before." "Oh, dey vere some good eatin I bet." "Now look, you make no nevermind, dose vere da best apples I ever did have, dey vas some good." "Oh, here dey come now, dey bedda know da wash der feet off."

The "t" at the end of words is usually silent: "get" becomes "ge."

Syntax 
The few syntactical characteristics that are following are now very rare or have slowly stopped being used.

One example is the splitting of a verb, which is very common in German and used in Lunenburg as well.

German: mitgehen ('to go with someone')
Examples: Will you go with? I am going with. Come on with!
German: Abwaschen ('to wash off')
Example: Wash your face off!

Thus, use, once, and with can be found at the end of a sentence.

Vocabulary 
Much vocabulary is from German stock, but a few extraordinary New England features are also rare or not used in the rest of southwestern Nova Scotia.
 get awake instead of wake up
 all in the sense of all gone (as in German); for example: My money is all
  from German  "to eat greedily"
 raised doughnuts have the name  which comes from the German word Fastnacht
 : slices of dried apple,  (singular) derives from the German word 
  means insipid and derives from the German

See also 

 Canadian English
 Atlantic Canadian English
 Pennsylvania German language
 Rhoticity in English

References

Bibliography 
 
 
 
 
 
 

Canadian English
Culture of Nova Scotia
Lunenburg County, Nova Scotia